Cheryl Metoyer is an Eastern Band Cherokee researcher and professor of library and information science. Her research is focused on Indigenous systems of knowledge, especially in relation to American Indian and Alaskan tribal nations, as well as ethics and leadership in cultural communities. She holds the position of Associate Professor Emeritus and the Director of the Indigenous Information Research Group (IIRG) at the iSchool at the University of Washington.

Education 
Metoyer holds bachelor of arts and master of arts degrees from Immaculate Heart College. Metoyer received her doctoral degree in library and information science from Indiana University in 1976.

Career 
Metoyer has served on faculty at a number of universities in the United States. She is currently an Associate Professor Emeritus at the University of Washington. She was previously on faculty at the UCLA Graduate School of Library and Information Science. She was the Chief Academic Affairs Officer for the Mashantucket Pequot Tribal Nation. From 1993 to 1997, Dr. Metoyer held the Rupert Costo Chair in American Indian History at the University of California, Riverside.

Metoyer worked with numerous Indigenous groups to assist with the development of their libraries, archives and museums. She was Project Director at the National Indian Education Association where she worked with tribal and state agencies to plan and develop library services, including the Mashantucket Pequot, Cahuilla, San Manuel, Yakama, Navajo, Seneca, Mohawk and the Lakota nations

Metoyer has researched and developed Indigenous subject headings for use within library and information systems, including the Mashantucket Pequot Thesaurus Project where she acted as principal investigator. The thesaurus is intended to: "construct a user-centered thesaurus, designed to reflect the information-seeking behavior of scholars and researchers who study American Indian subjects." It can be applied in a number of settings, including a museum setting as is demonstrated in an article by Littletree and Metoyer.

Using Indigenous worldviews and perspectives Metoyer's developed a taxonomy of gatekeeper theory in ethnolinguistic communities as a way to consider systems of control and their application within structures such as information systems.

Awards and honours 
The Joint Conference of Librarians of Color Legacy Award (2018)
Rockefeller Fellowship in the Humanities (2006)

Advisory roles 
Advisory Board, Newberry Library D’Arcy McNickle Center for American Indian History
The Southwest Museum
The National Commission on Libraries and Information Science
The National Endowment for the Humanities
The U.S. Department of the Interior
The National Museum of the American Indian
The University of Arizona, Knowledge River Program. 
UW House of Knowledge Planning Committee.

Publications

References 

Eastern Band Cherokee people
Library science scholars
Living people
Native American academics
Native American women academics
American women academics
University of Washington faculty
Year of birth missing (living people)
21st-century Native Americans
21st-century Native American women
Native American librarianship